Amazmaz is an isolated elevation with steep slopes in the western part of the Adrar plateau in Mauritania, 300 km northeast of the capital Nouakchott.

Rock paintings of the Amazmaz gueltas
At the foot of the hill there are the gueltas of Amazmaz, a chain of ponds, hidden among rocks and surrounded by rushes, but used for thousands of years, as evidenced by the rock paintings on the slopes bordering the waters.

Gallery

References

Adrar Region
Archaeological sites in Mauritania
History of Mauritania
Saharan rock art
Caves of Mauritania
Archaeological sites of Western Africa